People's Liberation Army General Armaments Department (GAD) was founded in April 1998 and is in charge of equipping and arming the People's Liberation Army, as well as overseeing and improving military technology. It is one of the four "general departments" that fall under the Central Military Commission. Various space launch sites across the country also fall under its jurisdiction.

The department was disbanded in January 2016 and the new agency, Equipment Development Department of the Central Military Commission was founded.

Structure

Director 
General Zhang Youxia (since October 2012)
Deputy Directors
Lt. General Liu Guozhi (Since December 2010)
Lt. General Zhang Yulin (Since 2011)
Lt. General Niu Hongguang (Since July 2009)
Lt. General Liu Sheng (Since May 2012)
Lt. General Wang Li
Political Commissar
General Wang Hongyao (since July 2011)
Deputy Political Commissar
Lt. General Chai Shaoliang (December 2014)

Discipline Inspection Department

Directly Subordinated Organs Work Department
Liaison Department
Organization Department
Propaganda Department
Security Department

Human spaceflight 
The human spaceflight effort of the PRC used to be  conducted by the China Manned Space Engineering Office, which was a special department within the General Armaments Department.

References

People's Liberation Army